Season 2010–2011 in the French Elite One Championship the top level league competition saw Lézignan Sangliers retain their title after they finished top of the table and then went on to beat Limoux Grizzlies in the Grand Final in Narbonne 17-12. The season ran from October to May and after 20 rounds of home and away matches the top five entered the play-offs. At the end of the season both RC Carpentras XIII and Saint-Gaudens Bears were relegated. The Lord Derby Cup was also won by Lezignan Sagliers to complete a second successive league and cup double, they beat Pia XIII in the final 27-18 in Carcassonne.

Table 

Points win=3: draw=2: loss=1:

Play-offs 
Week 1
 Elimination Quarter-Final - Villeneuve Leopards 37-30 AS Carcassonne
 Qualifying Final - Limoux Grizzlies 8-22 Pia XIII
Week 2
 Elimination Semi-Final - Limoux Grizzlies 40-24 Villeneuve Leopards
 Major Semi-Final - Lézignan Sangliers 25-24 Pia XIII
Week 3
 Elimination Final - Pia XIII 12-26 Limoux Grizzlies

Grand Final

See also 

 Rugby league in France
 French Rugby League Championship
 Elite One Championship

References

External links 

 French rugby league website

Rugby league competitions in France
2010 in French rugby league
2011 in French rugby league